William "Skip" Gerard Vanderbundt (born December 4, 1946) is a former American football linebacker who played in the National Football League (NFL) from 1969-1978.  

He played college football at Oregon State University and was selected in the 3rd round (69th overall) by the San Francisco 49ers in the 1968 NFL Draft.  He would play for the 49ers until the 1978 season, after which he played for the New Orleans Saints in his last year.

He now resides in Sacramento, California with his wife Judy.

External links
Skip Vanderbundt stats

1946 births
American football linebackers
Living people
New Orleans Saints players
Oregon State Beavers football players
San Francisco 49ers players